Sang-hyun is a Korean unisex given name, predominantly masculine. Its meaning differs based on the hanja used to write each syllable of the name. There are 35 hanja with the reading "sang" and 35 hanja with the reading "hyun" on the South Korean government's official list of hanja which may be registered for use in given names.

People with this name include:

Entertainers
Um Sang-hyun (born 1971), South Korean voice actor
Yoon Sang-hyun (born 1973), South Korean actor
Thunder (singer) (born Park Sang-hyun, 1990), South Korean singer, former member of boy band MBLAQ

Government and politics
Song Sang-hyun (1551–1595), Joseon Dynasty civil minister and general
Song Sang-hyun (born 1941), South Korean lawyer, president of the International Criminal Court
Sam Yoon (Korean name Yoon Sang-hyun, born 1970), South Korean-born American local politician in Boston

Sportspeople
Kim Sang-hyun (boxer) (born 1955), South Korean boxer
Chung Sang-hyun (born 1963), South Korean field hockey player
Cho Sang-hyun (born 1976), South Korean basketball player 
Kim Sang-hyeon (baseball) (born 1980), South Korean baseball player
Park Sang-hyeon (born 1983), South Korean sledge hockey player
Park Sang-hyun (golfer) (born 1983), South Korean professional golfer
Choi Sang-hyun (born 1984), South Korean football defender (K-League Classic)
An Sang-hyun (born 1986), South Korean football midfielder (K-League Classic)

Others
Sang Hyun Lee (born 1938), South Korean-born American theologian
Lee Sang-hyun (born 1955), South Korean sculptor

See also
List of Korean given names

References

Korean masculine given names